The International Cocoa Quarantine Centre (ICQC), located in Arborfield, a suburb of Reading, Berkshire, United Kingdom, is an organization aiming to reduce the amount of disease affecting cocoa plants. Cocoa plants are quarantined in a  greenhouse before being transported across the globe. Quarantining cocoa plants is considered important because over 70% of the global cocoa supply originates from West Africa, and therefore the cocoa market is susceptible to any catastrophic effects that should occur in that region.

ICQC is part of the University of Reading. It was founded in 1985.

References

External links

1985 establishments in England
Cacao diseases
Plant pathogens and diseases
Phytopathology